Antal Csárdi (born in Budapest, Hungary on November 8, 1976) is a Hungarian entrepreneur and politician. He is a member of National Assembly of Hungary (Országgyűlés). In the 2018 general elections he was elected a member of the National Assembly, and is currently the individual Member of Parliament for the Downtown, Castle District and partly Ferencváros and Józsefváros.

References 

Living people
1976 births
People from Budapest
Hungarian politicians
21st-century Hungarian politicians
LMP – Hungary's Green Party politicians
Members of the National Assembly of Hungary (2018–2022)
Members of the National Assembly of Hungary (2022–2026)